Lightning Ridge Airport  is an airport located  south southwest of Lightning Ridge, New South Wales, Australia.

Airlines and destinations

See also
List of airports in New South Wales

References

External links
Picture of Lightning Ridge Airport

Airports in New South Wales